Steven Craig Damman (born December 15, 1952) the son of Jerry and Marilyn Damman, disappeared along with his sister Pamela on October 31, 1955 while he was left in a stroller in front of a bakery on Long Island, New York, United States. His sister was found unharmed a few yards from the shop. He was 2 years old at the time of his disappearance. Damman's family received multiple different ransom notes, including one in late November 1955 demanding $3,000 ($32,183 in 2022), then $10,000 ($107,277 in 2022), then $14,000 ($150,188 in 2022) for his return, though they were dismissed by police as hoaxes or "cruel pranks". The ransom letters sent in late November turned out to be a Queens College student who had nothing to do with Damman's disappearance. In 2009, John Barnes of Michigan came forward and suspected he may have been Damman.

John Barnes
In 2009, John Barnes, of Kalkaska, Michigan, who suspected that he was Steven Damman, underwent DNA testing. On Thursday, June 18, 2009, FBI Special Agent Andrew Arena released a statement saying that "DNA samples analysed by the FBI laboratory in Quantico, Virginia, show John Barnes and Pamela Damman Horne, Steven Damman's sister, do not share the same mother." As of 2023, Damman is still missing.

See also
List of people who disappeared

References

External links
Finding Steven Damman? Family Waiting for DNA Confirmation (ABC News)
Man who says he's Steven Damman, kidnapped 54 years ago, speaks
Michigan man claims he was N.Y. boy who vanished in 1955 (CNN)
Breakthrough in case linked to Boy in the Box mystery

1950s births
1950s missing person cases
Kidnapped American children
Missing person cases in New York (state)
Living people